Dial H was a DC Comics superhero title launched in 2012 as part of the second wave of The New 52. It is a contemporary, frequently humorous take on the Silver Age title Dial H for Hero. It was written by novelist China Miéville, featuring artwork primarily by Mateus Santolouco and Alberto Ponticelli with Brian Bolland as the cover artist.

Premise
The comic tells of an out-of-shape man named Nelson Jent discovering that dialing H-E-R-O at a mysterious phone booth will transform him into unique, though short-lived, superheroes. Each time creates a new persona with a new set of powers, eventually returning him to his normal self.

DC Comics cancelled the title, concluding with issue #15 on August 7, 2013. An epilogue issue titled Justice League #23.3 Dial E was released as part of Villains Month initiative.

Collected editions
 Dial H Vol. 1: Into You (Dial H #0-6)
 Dial H Vol. 2: Exchange (Dial H #7-15, Justice League #23.3)

References

DC Comics titles
2012 comics debuts
Telephony in popular culture